Rajarhat is an upazila of Kurigram District in the Division of Rangpur, Bangladesh. Since 1981 it had been a Thana and later on September 14, 1983 was turned into an upazila by the government.

Geography
It is surrounded by Phulbari and Lalmonirhat sadar upazilas on the north, Ulipur and Pirgachha upazilas on the south, Kurigram sadar upazila on the east, Lalmonirhat Sadar and Kaunia upazilas on the west. It has 27,357 households and a total area of 166.23 km2. Two rivers, Teesta and Dharla pass through this upazila.

Demographics
As of the 2011 Bangladesh census, Rajarhat has a population of 192,689 with a population density of 945 people per square kilometer. Males constitute 50.52% of the population, and females 49.48%.  Upazila's  adult (over 18)  population is 72315. The average literacy rate of the people is 40.66% with 46.62% of male and 34.65% of female being literate.

Points of interest
 Sindurmati Dighi
 Chandamari Mosque
 Pangeshwari Temple
 Gharialdanga Zamindar Bari
 Panga Rajbari
 Two cannons ascribed to Fate Khan and Kalu Khan (Panga Rajbari)
 Koteshwar Shiva Mandir

Administration
Rajarhat Upazila is divided into seven union parishads: Biddanondo, Chakirpashar, Chinai, Gharialdanga, Nazimkhan, Rajarhat, and Umarmajid. The union parishads are subdivided into 110 mauzas and 180 villages.

Similar to other upazilas in the country, Upazila Parisad headed by an Upazila Chairman who is elected in a direct vote of the people is the highest form of local government in Rajarhat upazila.

Education
 Literacy Rate: 60%
 Number of Colleges: 4
 Number of High Schools: 34
 Number of Madrasas: 45
 Number of Primary Schools (government run): 49
 Number of Primary Schools (private): 67

Notable residents
 Abdullah Sarwrdi (Ex MP)
 Raufun Basunia (Late leader of anti dictatorship movement)
 Jahangir Hossain Chowdhury  (First Upazilla Chairman Rajarhat) 
 Badol Khondokar ( film director and producer )

See also
Upazilas of Bangladesh
Districts of Bangladesh
Divisions of Bangladesh

References

Upazilas of Kurigram District